Arthur, Art, or Artie Wilson may refer to:

Sport 
Art Wilson (1885–1960), baseball catcher
Arthur Wilson (rugby union) (1886–1917), British rugby union player and Olympic medalist
Arthur Wilson (gynaecologist) (1888–1947), Australian gynaecologist, obstetrician and Australian rules footballer 
Keith Wilson (cricketer) (Arthur Keith Wilson, 1894–1977), English cricketer
Arthur Wilson (English footballer) (1908–2000), Southampton, West Ham United and Chester footballer
Arthur James Wilson (1858–1945), English cyclist and journalist
Artie Wilson (1920–2010), American baseball player
Arthur Wilson (administrator) (died 2021), Australian administrator and historian associated with the Fitzroy Football Club

Military 
Arthur Wilson (Royal Navy officer) (1842–1921), English Admiral and First Sea Lord
Arthur H. Wilson (1881–1953), Philippine-American War Medal of Honor recipient
Arthur R. Wilson (1894–1956), US General in WW2
Arthur Gillespie Wilson (1897–1982), Australian Army officer

Other 
Sergeant Arthur Wilson, character from the British television sitcom Dad's Army
Arthur Wilson (writer) (1595–1652), English writer
Arthur Wilson (shipping magnate) (1836–1909), English ship-owner from Hull
Arthur Wilson (judge) (1837–1915), English judge
Stanley Wilson (British politician) (Arthur Stanley Wilson, 1868–1938), Member of Parliament for Holderness
Arthur Wilson (Western Australian politician) (1869–1948), former Western Australian politician
Arthur McCandless Wilson (1902–1979), American professor of biography
Arthur Wilson (crystallographer) (1914–1995), Canadian crystallographer (Cambridge and Birmingham)
Arthur A. Wilson (born 1968), Indian cinematographer
 Arthur Wilson 1, mountaineer on the 1969 British Kilimanjaro Expedition
 Arthur Wilson 2, mountaineer on the 1969 British Kilimanjaro Expedition